Cociella heemstrai is a species of demersal, marine ray-finned fish belonging to the family Platycephalidae, the flatheads. It is found in the western Indian Ocean off eastern Africa and Madagascar. Its biology is little know but it is caught by fisheries.

Taxonomy
Cociella heemstrai was first formally described in 1996 by Leslie William Knapp with the type locality given as Kenya. These fishes were previously regarded as a population of the crocodile flathead (C. crocodilus) but were recognised as a valid species in 1996. The specific name honours the American-South African ichthyologist Philip C. Heemstra of the South African Institute for Aquatic Biodiversity in recognition of his assistance to Knapp's studies of flatheads.

Description
Cociella heemstrai is one of the species of Cociella which has 12 soft rays in the first dorsal fin and in the anal fin and have between 9 and 11 gill rakers on the first gill arch. There is a vivid yellow bar in the centre of the caudal fin, dark bands over the back and 4 or 5 paired white spots on the upper body.

Distribution and habitat
Cociella heemstrai is found in the western Indian Ocean from Kenya in the north south to Durban in KwaZulu-Natal as well as being found in Madagascar.

Biology
Cociella heemstrai is abundant but little is known about its population, life history and ecology.

Fisheries
Cociella heemstrai  is commonly caught in trawldown and also using seine nets in shallow estuaries.

References

heemstrai
Fish described in 1996